The inhabitants of the seigneurie and the Republic of Geneva were divided into four orders of people: the Citoyens, the Bourgeois, the Habitants, and the Natifs. The Citoyens and the Bourgeois formed the bourgeoisie and, thus the patrician class of the Republic.

Status 

The Citoyens (citizens) were offspring of bourgeois and born in the city. Only their males could reach the status of magistrate.
The Bourgeois were offspring  of bourgeois or citizens who were born in a foreign country, or foreigners who had acquired the right of the bourgeoisie from the Magistrate. To gain access to the bourgeoisie, they had to buy it. In addition to the sum of money, it was customary to pay for a "seillot" and often a firearm. The bourgeoisie acquired services for free or at a reduced price. The bourgeois could be on the General Council and the Council of Two Hundred.
The Habitants (inhabitants): foreigners who had permission from the Magistrate to live in the city. They had to pay a housing tax. The inhabitants could access the bourgeoisie after living a certain number of years in Geneva.
The Natifs (natives): sons of foreigners allowed to live there, born in the city. They were deprived of any political right and could not practice certain professions.

History 
The assembly of the bourgeois and citizens of Geneva constituted the General Council. The number of bourgeois entitled to vote in the General Council never exceeded fifteen hundred. The General Council originally elected the Geneva Trustees, magistrates responsible for the administration of the commune, for a period of one year. Later, it appointed the Council of Two Hundred. Most citizens of Geneva came from neighboring Savoy because many of them worked and participated in the administration of the city of Geneva.

Revolts against nepotism and the influx of foreigners, particularly French Protestant refugees whom Calvin forced into the bourgeoisie to ensure his domination. He thus secured a majority in the elections of 1554. During the eighteenth century, Geneva was marked by many political troubles stemming from the inequality of rights between Genevois. The bourgeois, who enjoyed a privileged status, and their descendants, the citizens, held the upper hand: had all the political rights and many economic privileges. In front of them, the inhabitants and their descendants, the natives, form a population without political rights and hampered in its economic activities. Due to the French invasion of Switzerland, the bourgeoisie of Geneva lost their privilege in 1798. All Genevans have been ordinary citizens since that date.

The capacity of Bourgeois, that is to say of citizen of a city having political rights not available to other residents, forms the base of the urban organization of cities. This urban system in Europe for many cities dates back to Greco-Latin antiquity, others were founded around the year 1000. This system of urban civilization developed in parallel to the rural civilization rooted in the Neolithic era.

Notable families  

Anspach family
Bourdillon family
Pictet de Rochemont family (Charles Pictet de Rochemont)
Le Royer family
Rilliet family
Rilliet de Constant family (Louis Rilliet de Constant )
Mallet family
Patry family

See also 

History of Geneva
Swiss bourgeoisie
Patrician (post-Roman Europe)
Bourgeoisie
Bourgeois of Brussels
Bourgeois of Paris
Seven Noble Houses of Brussels
Guilds of Brussels

Notes and references

Authority 
Content in this edit is translated from the French Wikipedia article at :fr:Bourgeoisie de Genève; see its history for attribution.

History of Geneva
Estates (social groups)
Bourgeoisie